Lucky Strike is a bowling alley chain operated by Lucky Strike Entertainment, LLC, which owns and operates a chain of facilities that include bowling alleys and billiard parlors, bars, lounges, restaurants and venues for art and music. Founded in 2003, the company is based in Sherman Oaks, Los Angeles, California.

History 

In 2008, the Hollywood branch of Lucky Strike was used in Episode 5, Season 11 of America's Next Top Model; the marquee bearing the name of the alley was clearly visible as the contestants walked in. In the episode, Jay Alexander presided over a "teach"--a learning session in which the contestants were asked to perform a runway walk along a lane of the bowling alley.

In 2010, the company and CEO Steven Foster were subjects for an episode of CBS's Undercover Boss.

Pop culture 
In the 2021 film Venom: Let There Be Carnage, as Venom is arguing with his host when he is ready to eat an alleyway mugger, he mentions Lucky Strike when he said he was going to use the mugger's head to bowl a 300-point game.

References

External links 
 Lucky Strike Alleys

Bowling alleys
Restaurants established in 2003
Entertainment companies established in 2003